The AD43C is a type of mainline 6 axle Co'Co' diesel locomotive designed by Alstom and used by the Islamic Republic of Iran Railways (RAI). It was in production from 2000. Delivery started in 2002.

Alstom designated the vehicle with product code Prima DE 43 C AC.

Background
In 1998 GEC Alstom won an order valued at $125 million (later valued at €192 million) for the supply of 100 mixed use locomotives for Islamic Republic of Iran Railways. The first 20 units were to be manufactured at Alstom's factory in Belfort, France, the remainder at Wagon Pars in Iran. After production of an initial batch by Ruston the remaining engines were to be built by DESA in Iran under a technology transfer agreement.

Design
After premature failures both in engine and turbocharger RAI has de-rated the engine power gradually up to 2400 Kw.

Three variants were produced, a passenger version with a  top speed and a  axle load, and two freight versions with a  top speed and either a  axle load., 
Only two prototypes of ballasted locomotives had been introduced;as, the ballasts limited the engine room space and higher center of gravity raised concerns, the ballasts were later removed completely. The passenger locomotives were later assigned for freight service because of low reliability and introduction of more reliable ER24PC locomotives.

Current conditions
As of the early of 2016 only a third of AD43C locomotives are in revenue service. These locomotives have undergone substantial modifications since RAI put them into service. Most of the out of service locomotives have been cannibalized for salvaging components to make operation of the in-service locomotives possible. As maintaining of the locomotives in service out-costs their revenue, Iranian railways has decided to retrofit these locomotives with other engines.

See also 
 Iranian locomotives
IranRunner

Notes and references

Notes

References

External links
 
Images
RAI locomotives  railfaneurope.net

Alstom Prima diesel locomotives
Diesel-electric locomotives of Iran